Life In-Between is the debut album by American rock band Royal Bliss. It was released January 13, 2009 as a joint collaboration between Merovingian Music and Caroline Records under the exclusive license to Capitol Records. The album's first single, "Save Me," was released July 15, 2008. It is currently available for sale digitally at all major online retailers (iTunes, Amazon, Rhapsody, etc.). The song impacted radio only one day earlier on the 14th with a total of 11 adds at radio and climbing to 25 within a few days. Merovingian Music (abrv MRV) has released two web sites to accompany and promote the new single "Save Me." The first is an interactive e-card which provides to anyone that may be unfamiliar, an excellent introduction to the band. The second is a media packed web tools site for those who want to take action and promote. This site provides to the public a plethora of marketing tools and the necessary knowledge to use them effectively.

In October 2008 the band's label released the first video single for the song, "Save Me." To coincide with the videos release, ThePuppetVideo.com was put in place to view the video and help raise awareness. The video features a protagonist puppet used to explore the band's tormented psyche and shows the devolution and decline of the human condition when all hope is lost. A masked man in stop-motion symbolizes the character in a state of emotional decay and turmoil as he morphs into an actual puppet who is void of feeling, emotion and life itself, thus symbolizing that the fight is over and that he has lost all resemblance to his former self and has now become completely dehumanized.

The album was promoted by 97.5 The Blaze, a radio station in Salt Lake City under the call sign KZZQ (formerly KHTB). Also, the songs "Devils & Angels" and "Here They Come" were originally released on the band's previous album, After the Chaos II. In addition to those two tracks, the song "Brave" was also re-recorded for the album, but didn't make it.

Track listing 
All Songs Published By Royal Bliss LLC, (ASCAP)
"Save Me" (Bruschke, Harding, Middleton, Mortensen, Richards, Smith) – 3:12
"Here They Come" (Bruschke, Harding, Middleton, Mortensen, Richards, Smith) – 3:23
"Devils & Angels" (Bruschke, Harding, Middleton, Mortensen, Richards, Smith) – 3:41
"Pocket Of Dreams" (Middleton and Royal Bliss) – 3:47
"Finally Figured Out" (Harding, Middleton, Mortensen, Richards, Smith, Winegar) – 4:36
"We Did Nothing Wrong" (Harding, Middleton, Mortensen, Richards, Smith, Winegar) – 3:38
"By & By" (Middleton and Royal Bliss) – 3:24
"Wash It All Away" (Bruschke, Harding, Middleton, Mortensen, Richards, Smith) – 3:02
"Whiskey" (Bruschke, Harding, Middleton, Mortensen, Richards, Smith) – 3:02
"Fancy Things" (Harding, Middleton, Mortensen, Richards, Powell, Smith) – 4:18
"I Don't Mind" (Middleton and Royal Bliss) – 3:10
"I Was Drunk" (Middleton and Royal Bliss) – 4:04

Cut from Album 
"Brave"
"Music Man" (On Japanese Release)

Members
 Neal Middleton – lead vocals
 Taylor Richards – Acoustic & Electric guitars & background vocals
 Chris Harding – Electric guitar & background Vocals
 Tommy Mortensen – Electric bass guitar, Upright Bass & background Vocals
 Jake Smith – Drums, Percussion & background Vocals

Liner notes
 Producer: Rob Daiker and Royal Bliss
 "Devils and Angels" produced by: Rob Daiker,  Matt Winegar and Royal Bliss
 Mixed by: Rob Daiker
 Engineered by: Matt Winegar
 Mastered by: Ryan Foster at Freq Mastering in Portland, OR
 Recorded at: The Commune in Portland, OR
 Additional Recording at: Winegar Studios in Salt Lake City, UT
 Mixed at: Kung Fu Bakery in Portland, OR and at The Commune in Portland, OR
 Additional Pro Tools Editing: Tyson Griffin
 Additional Musicians: Rob Daiker and Matt Winegar...Guitars, Piano, Percussion, and background Vocals
 Additional Background Vocals: Gus Nicklos (From The Mediam) & The Little Revolution Singers
 String Arrangements, Recorded & Engineered: Kyle Lockwood at Setec Recording Studio Portland, OR
 Additional Production: Steven Walker & Additional Engineering by Joe Varela
 Strings Section performed by: Kyle Lockwood (Cello & Contrabass) & Nelly Kovalev (Violin & Viola)
 A&R: Marc Nathan
 Management: Steve Walker For Contraband Management and Sam Kaiser for DefConOne Entertainment
 Legal Representation: Lisa E. Socransky
 Booking: Andrew Goodfriend for TKO
 CD Graphics and Art Direction: Jake Smith and Royal Bliss
 Layout and Design: Greg Edgerton for Macabre Studios

External links
Save Me music video web site
Royal Bliss official web site
Royal Bliss on Myspace

Caroline Records albums
2009 albums